Daphniphyllum neilgherrense is a shrub or small tree found in the Indo-Malaysian region.

References

India Biodiversity

neilgherrense
Flora of India (region)
Flora of Sri Lanka
Plants described in 1919